Miloslavska planina (Cyrillic: Милославска планина) is a mountain on the border of Serbia and Bulgaria, near the town of Dimitrovgrad. Its highest peak Golema rudina has an elevation of 1486 meters above sea level.

References

Mountains of Serbia
Mountains of Bulgaria
Landforms of Pernik Province
Rhodope mountain range